This is a list of notable Palestinian Americans, including both original immigrants who obtained American citizenship and their American descendants.

The list is ordered by category of human endeavour. Persons with significant contributions in two fields are listed in each of the pertinent categories, to facilitate easy lookup.

To be included in this list, the person must have a Wikipedia article showing they are Palestinian American or must have references showing they are Palestinian American and are notable.

List

Academics 
 Nadia Abu El Haj, author and professor of anthropology at Barnard College and subject of a major tenure controversy case at Columbia University
 Ibrahim Abu-Lughod, former director of graduate studies at Northwestern University, father of Lila Abu-Lughod
 Lila Abu-Lughod, professor of anthropology and women's and gender studies at Columbia University
 Ismail al-Faruqi, former professor of religion at Temple University and authority on comparative religion & Islam
 Naseer Aruri, Chancellor Professor of Political Science at University of Massachusetts, Dartmouth
 Bilal Ayyub, professor, University of Maryland, College Park
 Hanna Batatu, Marxist historian most known for his work on Iraqi history
 Iymen Chehade, Palestinian-Israeli conflict professor, Columbia College, Art Institute  
Munther A. Dahleh, professor and director at Massachusetts Institute of Technology (Palestinian)
 Leila Farsakh, professor of political science at the University of Massachusetts, Boston
 Samih Farsoun, professor of sociology at American University and editor of Arab Studies Quarterly
 Nadia Hijab, journalist with Middle East Magazine and senior fellow at the Institute for Palestine Studies
 Rashid Khalidi, Edward Said Professor of Modern Arab Studies at Columbia University
 Joseph Massad, professor at Columbia University known for his work on nationalism and sexuality in the Arab world
 Ali H. Nayfeh, Palestinian-American mechanical engineer, the 2014 recipient of Benjamin Franklin Medal in mechanical engineering
 Edward Said, professor at Columbia University best known for his work on the subject of Orientalism.
 Rosemarie Said Zahlan, historian, journalist & author, sister of Edward Said
 Steven Salaita, former professor of English at Virginia Tech, winner of Myers Outstanding Book Award for the Study of Human Rights 2007
 Hisham Sharabi, Professor Emeritus of History and Umar al-Mukhtar Chair of Arab Culture at Georgetown University

Activists
 Alex Odeh, activist tied to the American-Arab Anti-Discrimination Committee

Authors, poets, playwrights, and journalists 
Susan Abulhawa, author
 Ali Abunimah, journalist and co-founder of The Electronic Intifada
 Ibtisam Barakat, writer and poet;
Jamal Dajani, journalist and television producer
 Suheir Hammad, poet
Ray Hanania, journalist
 Nadia Hijab, journalist with Middle East Magazine and senior fellow at the Institute for Palestine Studies
 Sahar Khalifeh, novelist and founder of the Women's Affairs Center in Nablus
Ismail Khalidi (writer), playwright
Daoud Kuttab, award-winning journalist;
 Najla Said, author, actress, playwright, and activist, daughter of Edward Said
 Naomi Shihab Nye, poet, songwriter, and novelist
 Lisa Suhair Majaj, poet and scholar
Dena Takruri, journalist, on-air presenter, and producer
 Shireen Abu Akleh, journalist and producer

Business and commerce 
 Sam Bahour, co-founder of the Palestine Telecommunications Company, first private telecommunications company in the Middle East
Mohamed Hadid, luxury real estate developer and businessman.
Bashar Masri, businessman who is involved in building Rawabi, the first Palestinian planned city
Ramzi Musallam, billionaire financier
Farouk Shami, founder of Farouk systems, a Houston-based company that manufactures hair care and spa products like CHI hair Irons

Film, performing, and visual arts 
 Hanan Alattar, operatic singer and actress
 Sama Alshaibi, visual artist
Mohammed Amer, comedian, writer, actor;
 Charlie Bisharat, Grammy Award-winning violinist
 Cherien Dabis, film director
 Said Durrah, comedian
 Hanni El Khatib, singer-songwriter and multi-instrumentalist
 Yousef Erakat, comedian
 Bella Hadid, model and actress 
 Gigi Hadid, model and actress 
 Rami Kashou, fashion designer
 Yousef Khanfar, photographer
 Mousa Kraish, actor 
 Mai Masri, filmmaker and director
 Jordan Nassar, visual artist
 Dean Obeidallah, comedian
 Tareq Salahi, appeared on television show The Real Housewives of D.C.
 Josie Totah, actress and comedian
 Amer Zahr, comedian, author and university lecturer 
 Waleed Zuaiter, actor and producer
 Michael Malarkey, actor and musician
 Nasri Tony Atweh, singer-songwriter, and record producer

Judiciary
 Edward Rafeedie, Federal District Court judge for the Central District of California from 1982 until his death in 2008.

Medicine 
 Laila Al-Marayati, director of women's health at the Eisner Pediatric and Family Medical Center in downtown Los Angeles
 Hashem El-Serag, doctor and medical researcher on  Hepatocellular carcinoma (HCC) and the hepatitis C virus

Military 
 Peter R. Mansoor, U.S. Army colonel, executive officer to Gen. David Petraeus during Iraq War troop surge of 2007

Musicians  
 Hanni El Khatib, singer-songwriter and multi-instrumentalist
 Fredwreck, record producer & DJ
 DJ Khaled, record producer & DJ
 Simon Shaheen, oud and violin musician and composer
 Belly, rapper

Politics 
 Imad-ad-Dean Ahmad, head of the Minaret of Freedom Institute, an Islamic libertarian think-tank
 Justin Amash, Congressman from Michigan
 Huwaida Arraf, co-founder of the International Solidarity Movement
 Mubarak Awad, founder of the Palestinian Centre for the Study of Nonviolence
Iman Jodeh، first Muslim legislator in Colorado
Johnny Khamis, member of the San Jose City Council.
Sam Rasoul, American politician, House of Delegates 11th District Election, 2017
Ibraheem Samirah, member of the Virginia House of Delegates.
Linda Sarsour, executive director of the Arab American Association of New York, civil rights activist, and co-chair of the Women's March on Washington (2017)
Chris Sununu, Governor of New Hampshire (R) (2017–), son of Governor John H. Sununu
 John E. Sununu, US Senator from New Hampshire (2003–09), son of John H. Sununu
 John H. Sununu, Governor of New Hampshire (1983–89) and White House Chief of Staff to President George H. W. Bush (1989–91)
Rashida Tlaib, U.S. Representative from Michigan's 13th Congressional district

Religion 
 Benny Hinn, Pentecostal televangelist
Omar Suleiman, imam

Sports
Oday Aboushi, American football player for the Detroit Lions of the National Football League (NFL) 
Hazem Ali, professional wrestling manager known as "Armando Estrada"
Gibran Hamdan, NFL QB 
Omar Jarun, soccer player and member of the Palestine national football team
Belal Muhammad, mixed martial artist 
Dean Muhtadi, professional wrestler known as "Mojo Rawley"
Ramsey Nijem, mixed martial artist
Tarek Saleh, former NFL player 
Omar Sheika, boxer

Other  
 Sami Al-Arian, former professor at University of South Florida, prominent civil rights activist, imprisoned & indicted on controversial charges, cleared then deported
 Nidal Malik Hasan, former soldier convicted of the 2009 Fort Hood shooting
 Palestina "Tina" Isa, honor killing victim, daughter of Palestinian American Zein Isa, her killer
 Rasmea Odeh, convicted of immigration fraud, for concealing her arrest, conviction, and imprisonment for a fatal terrorist bombing

See also
Palestinians
List of notable Palestinians
Palestinian diaspora

References

Lists of American people by ethnic or national origin
Palestinian